Daphnusa sinocontinentalis is a species of moth of the  family Sphingidae. It is known from south-east Asia, including Thailand.

References

Smerinthini
Moths described in 2009